Homaemus aeneifrons is a species of shield-backed bug in the family Scutelleridae. It is found in Central America and North America.

Subspecies
These two subspecies belong to the species Homaemus aeneifrons:
 Homaemus aeneifrons aeneifrons (Say, 1824)
 Homaemus aeneifrons extensus Walley, 1929

References

Scutelleridae
Articles created by Qbugbot
Insects described in 1824